Minuscule 171 (in the Gregory-Aland numbering), ε 407 (Soden), is a Greek minuscule manuscript of the New Testament, on parchment. Palaeographically it has been assigned to the 14th century. It has complex contents and full marginalia.

Description 

The codex contains a complete text of the four Gospels on 254 thick parchment leaves (size ). It is written in one column per page, in 20 lines per page (size of column 8.5 by 6.5 cm). The text is written in black ink, the capital letters in red. It is ornamented with silver.

There is also a division according to the smaller Ammonian Sections (Mark 236 - 16:12), with references to the Eusebian Canons (written below Ammonian Section numbers).

Text 

The Greek text of the codex is a representative of the Byzantine text-type. Aland placed it in Category V.
According to the Claremont Profile Method it represents cluster Π171 in Luke 1, Luke 10, and Luke 20.

History 

The manuscript was once in the property of Achilles Statius, as also was minuscule 169. It was examined by Bianchini, Birch (about 1782), and Scholz. C. R. Gregory saw it in 1886.

It is currently housed at the Biblioteca Vallicelliana (C. 73.2), at Rome.

See also 

 List of New Testament minuscules
 Biblical manuscript
 Textual criticism

References

Further reading 

 

Greek New Testament minuscules
14th-century biblical manuscripts